José Ricardo Eliaschev (31 May 1945 – 18 November 2014), better known as Pepe Eliaschev, was an Argentine journalist and writer.

The author of ten books, he worked as a journalist and was well known for interviewing world figures such as Muhammad Ali, Ted Kennedy, Jorge Rafael Videla, Raúl Alfonsín, José Mujica, Eduardo Frei Ruiz-Tagle, Carlos Fuentes, Mario Vargas Llosa, Ernesto Sabato and Augusto Roa Bastos. In addition, he was director of Municipal Radio of Buenos Aires from 1989-91. His last radio show was Esto que pasa.

Personal life
Eliaschev was born on 31 May 1945 in Buenos Aires, the grandson of Jewish immigrants from Podolia (present-day Ukraine) and Kishinev (present-day Moldova) who arrived to Argentina in the early 20th century fleeing Czarist pogroms. 

He died on 18 November 2014, aged 69, of pancreatic cancer. He is buried at the La Tablada Israelite Cemetery.

References

1945 births
2014 deaths
Argentine journalists
Male journalists
Argentine people of Moldovan-Jewish descent
Argentine people of Ukrainian-Jewish descent
Jewish Argentine writers
Writers from Buenos Aires
Deaths from pancreatic cancer
Deaths from cancer in Argentina